Al Fushqa or al-Fashaga ( ( is a zone of Amhara, Ethiopia. The capital is Showak. The district has very fertile agricultural land and forms a disputed region between Ethiopia and Sudan known as the al-Fashaga triangle.

History

Al Fushqa is located on the Ethiopia–Sudan border, and is claimed by both Sudan and Ethiopia. Under Egyptian and Ethiopian pressure, the Sudanese Army withdrew from Al Fushqa in 1995 as well as the Halaib Triangle following an assassination attempt against Egyptian President Hosni Mubarak in Ethiopia. Sudanese President Omar al-Bashir was accused of supporting the Egyptian Islamic Jihad group behind the attempt. Under a compromise reached in 2008, Ethiopian farmers cultivated the land while Sudan retained administrative control of it. This compromise ended in November 2020, when the Tigray War began and Sudan expelled the Ethiopians, resulting in border clashes between the two countries. On 2 December, the Sudanese Armed Forces occupied the Khor Yabis area, controlled by Ethiopia for 25 years, expelling Ethiopian militants without a fight.

References

Regions of Ethiopia
Territorial disputes of Ethiopia
Territorial disputes of Sudan
Ethiopia–Sudan border